Agaath Doorgeest (3 March 1914 – 8 December 1991) was a Dutch hurdler. She competed in the women's 80 metres hurdles at the 1936 Summer Olympics.

In 1934, Doorgeest won the silver medal at the 1934 Women's World Games in the 4 × 100 m relay (with Cor Aalten, Jo Dalmolen, Agaath Doorgeest and Iet Martin).

References

1914 births
1991 deaths
Athletes (track and field) at the 1936 Summer Olympics
Dutch female hurdlers
Olympic athletes of the Netherlands
Place of birth missing